Jandiatuba Mayoruna is an extinct indigenous language of the Brazilian Amazon basin, near the borders of Peru and Colombia.

References

Indigenous languages of Western Amazonia
Panoan languages
Extinct languages of South America